Carl Erik Magnus "Calle" Wede (born 20 April 1990) is a Swedish footballer who plays as a right midfielder. He is the twin brother of fellow professional footballer Anton Wede.

References

Calle Wede till Helsingborg‚ hn.se, 30 November 205

External links

1990 births
Living people
IF Elfsborg players
Helsingborgs IF players
Falkenbergs FF players
GAIS players
Örgryte IS players
Allsvenskan players
Superettan players
Swedish footballers
Association football defenders